The 61st Assembly District of Wisconsin is one of 99 districts in the Wisconsin State Assembly.  Located in southeastern Wisconsin, the district covers most of Kenosha County.  It includes the villages of Bristol, Paddock Lake, Pleasant Prairie, Salem Lakes, and Twin Lakes, and the western half of the village of Somers (west of Wisconsin Highway 31).  It also contains the Richard Bong State Recreation Area and Chiwaukee Prairie Nature Preserve. The district is represented by Republican Amanda Nedweski, since January 2023.

The 61st Assembly District is located within Wisconsin's 21st Senate District, along with the 62nd and 63rd Assembly Districts.

History
The district was created in the 1972 redistricting act (1971 Wisc. Act 304) which first established the numbered district system, replacing the previous system which allocated districts to specific counties.  The 61st district was drawn roughly in line with the boundaries of the previous Racine County 2nd district (the northern part of the city of Racine).  The 61st district boundaries were relatively consistent in redistricting from 1972 to 2011, with the major exception of the 1982 redistricting, which scrambled all State Assembly districts and moved the 61st district to north-central Wisconsin for the 1983–1984 legislative session.  That changed with the controversial 2011 redistricting plan (2011 Wisc. Act 43) which moved the district to Kenosha County—the previous territory covered by the 61st district is now split between the 62nd and 66th Assembly districts.  This was part of a larger gerrymandering plan for the Racine and Kenosha County districts to convert one Assembly seat and one Senate seat from tossups to safely Republican.

List of past representatives

References 

Wisconsin State Assembly districts
Racine County, Wisconsin
Kenosha County, Wisconsin